Oiketerion (οἰκητήριον) is a Greek word meaning "dwelling", or "habitation".

It is used in two places in the Bible; in the King James Version translation, they are:

For the latter verse, the term has been interpreted as meaning "the body as a dwelling place for the spirit".

See also
 Christian eschatology
Resurrection of the dead in Christianity

References

New Testament Greek words and phrases